Leia bivittata is a species of fungus gnats in the family Mycetophilidae.

References

Further reading

External links

 

Mycetophilidae